The 2009–10 season was Valencia Club de Fútbol's 92nd in existence and the club's 23rd consecutive season in the top flight of Spanish football. It was the second season with Unai Emery as manager.

Squad

Competitions

La Liga

League table

Matches

External links
 Valencia CF squad 2009-10 at Eufo.de
 La Liga fixtures season 2009-10 at the Rec.Sport.Soccer Statistics Foundation

Valencia CF seasons
Valencia CF